Centering Prayer is a form of Christian contemplative prayer, to center awareness on the presence of God. This modern movement in Christianity was initiated by three Trappist monks of St. Joseph's Abbey in Spencer, Massachusetts in the 1970s, Fr. William Meninger, Fr. M. Basil Pennington and Abbot Thomas Keating, in response to the growing popularity of Asian meditation methods.

Name 
The name was taken from Thomas Merton's description of contemplative prayer, from which centering prayer draws, as prayer that is "centered entirely on the presence of God". In his book Contemplative Prayer, Merton writes "Monastic prayer begins not so much with 'considerations' as with a 'return to the heart,' finding one's deepest center, awakening the profound depths of our being in the presence of God".

Origins 
The 20th century Trappist monk and writer Thomas Merton renewed Christian interest in contemplative practices. He was an open-minded monk, who was influenced by Buddhist meditation, particularly as found in Zen. He was a lifetime friend of Buddhist Thich Nhat Hanh, praised Chogyam Trungpa who founded Shambhala Buddhism in the United States and was also an acquaintance of the current Dalai Lama. His theology attempted to unify existentialism with the tenets of the Roman Catholic faith. As such he was also an advocate of the non-rational meditation of contemplative prayer, which he saw as a direct confrontation of finite and irrational man with his ground of being.

Cistercian monk Father Thomas Keating, a founder of Centering Prayer, was abbot all through the 1960s and 1970s at St. Joseph's Abbey in Spencer, Massachusetts. This area is thick with religious retreat centres, including the well-known Theravada Buddhist centre, Insight Meditation Society. Fr. Keating tells of meeting many young people, some who stumbled on St. Joseph's by accident, many of them born Catholic, who had turned to Eastern practices for contemplative work. He found many of them had no knowledge of the contemplative traditions within Christianity and set out to present those practices in a more accessible way. The result was the practice now called Centering Prayer.

Seeds of what would become known as contemplation, for which the Greek term  theoria is also used, were sown early in the Christian era. The creators of the Centering Prayer movement trace their roots to the contemplative prayer of the Desert Fathers of early Christian monasticism, to the Lectio Divina tradition of Benedictine monasticism, and to works like The Cloud of Unknowing and the writings of St. Teresa of Avila and St. John of the Cross. The earliest Christian writings that clearly speak of contemplative prayer come from the 4th-century monk St. John Cassian, who wrote of a practice he learned from the Desert Fathers. Cassian's writings remained influential until the medieval era when monastic practice shifted from a mystical orientation to Scholasticism. During the 16th century, Carmelite saints Teresa of Avila and John of the Cross wrote and taught about advanced Christian prayer, which was given the name infused contemplation.

Practice
In Centering Prayer, the participant seeks the presence of God directly (aided by the Jesus Prayer, perhaps) and explicitly rejects discursive thoughts and imagined scenes. The participant's aim is to be present to the Lord, to "consent to God's presence and action during the time of prayer." Fr. M. Basil Pennington describes four steps for practicing Centering Prayer:
 Sit comfortably with your eyes closed, relax, and quiet yourself. Be in love and faith to God. 
 Choose a sacred word that best supports your sincere intention to be in the Lord's presence and open to His divine action within you. 
 Let that word be gently present as your symbol of your sincere intention to be in the Lord's presence and open to His divine action within you. 
 Whenever you become aware of anything (thoughts, feelings, perceptions, images, associations, etc.), simply return to your sacred word, your anchor.

In addition, Fr. Keating writes, "The method consists in letting go of every kind of thought during prayer, even the most devout thoughts". The "sacred word" can integrate with breathing in and out. Rather than being a tool to quiet the mind, it is a consent to the presence and action of God within and "just be" with God, helping people to be more present and open to God. Advocates of Centering Prayer also say it does not replace other prayer but encourages silence and deeper connection to God. 

Centering Prayer advocates link the practice to traditional forms of Christian meditation, such as on the Rosary, or Lectio Divina, and father Thomas Keating has promoted both Lectio Divina and Centering Prayer.

Reception
Pope Francis has not commented on Centering Prayer directly but has spoken very highly of Thomas Merton. Thomas Merton described contemplative prayer as prayer "centered entirely on the presence of God." Pope Francis listed Thomas Merton as one of four great Americans in a speech before the U.S. Congress in September 2015 and encouraged sowing dialogue and peace in "the contemplative style of Thomas Merton."

Criticism
In 1989, the Congregation for the Doctrine of the Faith, led by Cardinal Joseph Ratzinger (later Pope Benedict XVI) issued Letter to the Bishops of the Catholic Church on Some Aspects of Christian Meditation. The letter addresses problematic elements found in some modern prayer methods, many of which have been influenced by Eastern religions and the New Age movement. Fr. Keating notes that this letter does not apply to Centering Prayer, and states that "the gift of contemplative prayer can only be granted through the Holy Spirit." Connie Rossini and Dan Burke, however, argue that there are similarities between the teaching of Fr. Keating and his colleagues and specific criticisms made by the CDF, while Dan DeCelles considers Centering Prayer to fall afoul of the caution against similar prayer forms in this letter. 

In 2003, the Pontifical Council for Interreligious Dialogue and the Pontifical Council for Culture published Jesus Christ, The Bearer of the Water of Life: A Christian Reflection on the "New Age". Susan Brinkmann writes that her concerns were addressed in this document. Centering Prayer practitioners respond that Bearer of the Water of Life does not have doctrinal authority, and neither Vatican document mentions Centering Prayer, Contemplative Outreach, or Fr. Keating by name.

According to Connie Rossini, Centering Prayer is contradicted by the teachings of St. Theresa. She further states that centering prayer is in contradiction to Lectio Divina, arguing that traditional prayers such as the Holy Rosary and Lectio Divina engage the heart and mind with Sacred Scripture, while Centering Prayer is "devoid of content".

Rev. John D. Dreher argues that Centering Prayer is a distortion of the teachings of the Desert Fathers and The Cloud of Unknowing.

Research
Research has been conducted on the Centering Prayer program, indicating that it may be helpful for women receiving chemotherapy,
and that it may help congregants experience a more collaborative relationship with God, as well as reduced stress.

Andrew B. Newberg explained one study that examined the brains of nuns who engaged in Centering Prayer, which is meant to create a feeling of oneness with God. The nuns' brain scans showed similarities to people who use drugs like psilocybin mushrooms, Newberg said, and both experiences "tend to result in very permanent changes in the way in which the brain works."

See also
 Christian contemplation
 Jesus Prayer
 Hesychasm
 Hesychia

References

Sources
Printed sources

 

 
 

 

 

 

Web-sources

Further reading
 Sadhana: A Way to God. by Anthony de Mello. 1978. .
 
 Contemplative Prayer. by Thomas Merton. Image Books, 1996. .
 Active Meditations for Contemplative Prayer, by Thomas Keating. Continuum International Publishing Group, 1997. .
 Foundations for centering prayer and the Christian contemplative life, by Thomas Keating. Continuum International Publishing Group, 2002. .
 Open mind, open heart: the contemplative dimension of the Gospel, by Thomas Keating. Continuum International Publishing Group, 2002. .

 
 Chicoine, Glenn (2019), "A Defense of Centering Prayer," Cistercian Studies, 54(3), 319 - 340.

External links 
 Contemplative Outreach, network of people practicing Centering Prayer
 Is Centering Prayer Catholic? Finding intimacy with God through authentic contemplation.
 
 Interview with Thomas Keating on Centering Prayer by ReadTheSpirit.com
 Catholic Spiritual Direction.
 The Contemplative Society
 Contemplative Prayer and The Cloud of Unknowing
 The Cloud of Unknowing
 Kyrie Centering Prayer Index
 A Gift From the Desert
 Jesus Prayer
 About Centering Prayer
 Online Meditation Class

 
Catholic spirituality
Christian prayer
Christian contemplation